Lowell may refer to:

Places

United States 
 Lowell, Arkansas
 Lowell, California
 Lowell, Florida
 Lowell, Idaho
 Lowell, Indiana
 Lowell, Bartholomew County, Indiana
 Lowell, Maine
 Lowell, Massachusetts
 Lowell National Historical Park
 Lowell (MBTA station)
 Lowell Ordnance Plant
 Lowell, Michigan
 Lowell, North Carolina
 Lowell, Washington County, Ohio
 Lowell, Seneca County, Ohio
 Lowell, Oregon
 Lowell, Vermont, a New England town
 Lowell (CDP), Vermont, the main village in the town
 Lowell, West Virginia
 Lowell (town), Wisconsin
 Lowell, Wisconsin, a village within the town of Lowell
 Lowell Hill, California
 Lowell Point, Alaska
Lowell Township (disambiguation)

Other countries 
 Lowell glacier, near the Alsek River, Canada

Elsewhere 
 Lowell (lunar crater)
 Lowell (Martian crater)

Institutions in the United States

Arizona 
 Lowell Observatory, astronomical non-profit research institute, Flagstaff

California 
 Lowell High School (Whittier, California), high school, Whittier
 Lowell High School (San Francisco), high school, San Francisco
 Lowell Elementary School (Fresno, California), elementary school, Fresno

Indiana 
 Lowell High School (Lowell, Indiana), high school, Lowell

Massachusetts 
 Lowell Institute, educational foundation, Boston
 Lowell Line, train line, Boston
 Lowell House, Harvard undergrad dormitory, Cambridge
 Lowell Devils, hockey team, Lowell
 Lowell High School (Lowell, Massachusetts), high school, Lowell
 The Lowell, a historic apartment building, Cambridge
 The Sun (Lowell), newspaper, Lowell, Mass
 University of Massachusetts Lowell university, Lowell

Michigan 
 Lowell High School (Michigan), high school, Lowell

Other uses 
 Lowell (musician)
 Lowell (given name)
 Lowell (surname)
 Lowell family, a prominent family name in England and America
 Hurricane Lowell (disambiguation), the name given to three tropical cyclones in the Eastern Pacific Ocean
 USS Lowell (SP-504), a United States Navy patrol vessel and minesweeper in commission from 1917 to 1919

See also 
 Lovell (disambiguation)